John Philip Jacob Elkann (born 1 April 1976) is an Italian industrialist. In 1997, he became the chosen heir of his grandfather Gianni Agnelli, following the death of Gianni's nephew Giovanni Alberto Agnelli, and since 2004 has been leading the Agnelli family, an Italian multi-industry business dynasty. The family has been compared to the Kennedys.

Elkann chairs the automaker Stellantis and is the chief executive officer (CEO) of Exor, the holding company controlled by the Agnelli family, which also holds a controlling stake in Ferrari, CNH Industrial, Iveco Group, Juventus F.C., and The Economist Group. In July 2018, he was appointed chairman of Ferrari after Sergio Marchionne left due to health issues. In 2021, Elkann oversaw the merge between Fiat Chrysler and the PSA Group. He is the leader of a group that controls 14 brands, with production sites in 29 countries, employs 400,000 people, and is present in over 130 markets.

Early life and family 
Born in New York City on 1 April 1976, Elkann held both Italian and American citizenship; he renounced to the latter in 2012. He is the eldest son of Alain Elkann, a New York-born journalist and writer of French-Jewish and Italian-Jewish background, and his then Italian wife Margherita Agnelli. His parents divorced in 1981 and both have remarried. Elkann's maternal grandparents were the head of Fiat S.p.A., Gianni Agnelli, and the socialite Marella Agnelli (born Donna Marella Caracciolo di Castagneto); his great-grandfather was the industrialist Edoardo Agnelli, and his great-great-grandfather was Giovanni Agnelli, founder of Fiat S.p.A. His paternal great-grand-uncle was the banker Ettore Ovazza. He has a brother, Lapo Elkann, and a sister, Ginevra Elkann, as well as five half-siblings from his mother's second marriage, as Margherita Agnelli de Pahlen, to Serge de Pahlen. His younger half-siblings are Maria (born 1983), Pierre (born 1986), twins Sophie and Anna (born 1988), and Tatiana (born 1990).

Elkann attended primary school in both the United Kingdom and Brazil, before his family moved to Paris, where he obtained a baccalauréat scientifique at the State School Lycée Victor-Duruy in 1994. Later that same year, he moved to Italy to attend the Polytechnic University of Turin, where he graduated with a degree in management engineering in 2000; his thesis was entirely dedicated to e-commerce and online auctions. As a result of his international upbringing, he is fluent in four languages, including Italian, English, French, and Portuguese. According to those close to them, they speak of many similarities, such as the attachment to the family and particulary the grandfather, but also of many differences. In 2004, the elder Elkann was described as serious and rigorous, in contrast to the expansive and creative younger Elkann, who was in charge of operational marketing at Fiat. From their father, the two Elkanns share the Jewish heritage, which represented the first time that young heirs brought with them values and ethics that were different from those of the Catholic Agnelli family.

Career 

While pursuing a degree in engineering, Elkann gained work experience through several internships. They included a headlight plant in Birmingham, England (1996); a production line in Tychy, Poland (1997); a car dealership in Lille, France (1998); and at General Electric's corporate initiatives group where he worked on a thesis on e-auctions (1999). He also participated in the drafting of the project for the recovery of Fiat, the Morchio plan. In December 1997, at the age of 21, he was selected as the heir of his grandfather Gianni Agnelli in place of Giovanni Alberto Agnelli, the son of Gianni's younger brother, Umberto Agnelli, who had died at the age of 33; in 2008, Elkann was seen as "the great uknown". He was appointed to the Fiat S.p.A. board that same year, when he was 22, the same age his grandfather Gianni also joined it in 1943, and to the board of Giovanni Agnelli Sapaz (now Giovanni Agnelli B.V.), the family partnership controlling Exor.

In 2000, after graduating in Engineering from the Polytechnic University of Turin, he joined General Electric's Corporate Audit program. He left General Electric two years later; Elkann described his work at General Electric as "a beautiful experience, because you sit around a table where no one speaks your language and two out of three come from another continent." He moved back to Turin to be closer to his ageing grandfather, as well as to the family business. In 2003, Elkann joined IFIL, which later became Exor, where he was in charge of control and development, and was in particular responsible for supervising Rinascente and Alpitour. Elkann worked on the turnaround of Fiat Group. He was instrumental in the appointment of Fiat Chrysler Automobiles (FCA) CEO Sergio Marchionne in May 2004.

After the death of Gianni in 2003, which was followed by that of Elkann's great-uncle Umberto Agnelli in 2004, Elkann became vice-chairman of Fiat and vice-chairman of Giovanni Agnelli Sapaz. Franzo Grande Stevens and Gianluigi Gabetti were instrumental in the appointment of Elkann. In 2008, Elkann replaced 83-year-old Gabetti as the head of IFIL, which managed a portfolio worth eight billion euros. In March 2009, he merged the holding companies IFI and IFIL to create Exor, stepping to the role of chairman. In 2010, he became chairman of Fiat S.p.A. (then FCA), succeeding Luca Cordero di Montezemolo, and chairman of the Giovanni Agnelli Sapaz, succeeding Gabetti; at the time, Fiat had changed four CEOs in three years. Before this appointment, he mainly played a background role at Fiat. The Financial Times called Elkann's appointment "a confirmation of change that could prove to be the making of a new Fiat and also of the Agnelli family's future fortunes." 

In February 2011, Elkann was appointed chairman and CEO of Exor. The value of the company's assets has grown and multiplied nine times in ten years. He is an active member of several non-profit organizations and think tanks engaged in the global geopolitical debate, one of the founders of the Collège des Ingénieurs, and a trustee of the Museum of Modern Art. A member of the Confindustria presidential committee, he followed Fiat's decision to leave the group and resigned from his role as vice-chairman in October 2011, three months before Fiat's official departure in January 2012, "in the interests of the Association's autonomy and independence", as written in his resignation letter to then-president Emma Marcegaglia. In a 2013 interview to the Detroit Free Press, Elkann identified Bill Ford Jr. as a mentor. That same year, he was included by Fortune in the world's most influential managers under the age of 40.

In a November 2013 interview to Campden FB, Elkann said he wanted to change capitalism. He said: "There is an alternative to financial investors and professional investment managers, and that's what we want to be. You need to be able to portray business to society in a favourable way. All the emphasis has been on shareholder value, not stakeholder value. One of the benefits of family businesses is they focus on all stakeholders." Guido Corbetta, a professor at Bocconi University in Milan and a family business expert, said that one of the biggest achievements at Exor was the management of the succession to Elkann from his grandfather. Corbetta said: "He was dominant. Anyone succeeding him would have huge shoes to fill. But the fact that Elkann has done so and managed to beat his own path, distancing himself a lot from his grandfather's particular style of running businesses and being successful, is a great achievement for Fiat, the Agnelli family, and even more so Elkann." In 2015, Elkann acquired the insurer company PartnerRe.

Having previously held a seat on Rupert Murdoch's News Corp board and an inherited seat on the board of RCS Media Group, Elkann acquired a majority stake in The Economist Group in 2015; he was described as the opposite of fellow media mogul Silvio Berlusconi. In June 2017, to celebrate the 150th anniversary of Italian newspaper La Stampa, which was acquired by the Agnelli family in 1926, he organized an international conference, "The Future of Newspapers", which was attended by The Washington Post owner and Amazon founder Jeff Bezos, and other media representatives, such as Lionel Barber, Zanny Minton Beddoes, Mark Thompson, and Robert Thomson. Under Elkann's management, Exor purchased the controlling stake in GEDI Gruppo Editoriale from CIR Group for $113 million in 2019; GEDI is the owner of two of Italy's most influential newspapers, namely the Rome-based, liberal-leaning La Repubblica and the centrist, Turin-based La Stampa.

In July 2018, a few days before the death of Marchionne, Elkann was chosen to take his place at Ferrari. In 2019, Elkann announced he would be trying to merge FCA with Peugeot S.A. (PSA Group), with the goal of forming the world's fourth largest OEM by volume and third largest by revenues, and catch up on electric cars, as well as autonomous veichles. In May 2019, he tried to also enlist Renault. In December 2019, it was announced that FCA and Peugeot had reached an agreement to merge.  In July 2020, he and FCA's CEO Mike Manley announced that the name of the combined company would be Stellantis.

In March 2020, Elkann and FCA's board of directors agreed to forego their remaining compensation for 2020 due to the COVID-19 pandemic. Between December 2020 and September 2021, following the resignation of Louis Camilleri, he held the position of CEO of Ferrari until the appointment of Benedetto Vigna. In May 2021, Elkann was nominated Knight of the Order of Merit for Labour in the automotive industry by Italy's president Sergio Mattarella. In 2021, Forbes estimated his net worth to be around US$2 billion.

In two January 2023 interviews to La Repubblica and La Stampa, in remembrance of the twenty years since Gianni's death, Elkann said: "If we compare the company in 2003 and today's we see that revenues go from 22 billion to 130 in the first nine months of 2022 alone; there were 22 car models produced then, which employed 49,000 people, for 4 brands: today 280,000 people produce over 100 models for 14 brands. We have enhanced the Fiat brand, so much so that next year the electric 500 will also be exported to the USA. We have relaunched the Maserati and Alfa Romeo brands and we are relaunching Lancia. Furthermore, today we produce in Italy and sell models of highly successful non-Italian brands, such as Jeep, all over the world."

Sports

Juventus F.C. 
As a member of the Agnelli family, Elkann is involved with the association football club Juventus, the most renowned Italian football club. Into the 21st century, when Elkann took over, Juventus had won all six major UEFA competitions, reached four UEFA Champions League finals from 1995 to 2003 and consecutively from 1995 to 1998, was voted the seventh best of the FIFA Club of the Century in 2000, and in 2009 was named the second best club of the 20th century; by the early 2000s, the club had the third best revenue in Europe at over €200 million. This all changed in 2006, when Calciopoli controversially hit the club, which was demoted to Serie B for the first time in its history despite the club being acquitted and the leagues were ruled to be regular in the Calciopoli trials. In the words of Fulvio Bianchi, early 2000s Juventus were "stronger than all those that came after, and had €250 million in revenue, being at the top of Europe, and 100 sponsors. It took ten years to recover and return to the top Italians, not yet Europeans: now the club makes over €300 million, but in the meantime Real, Bayern, and the others have taken off."

In a July 2007 interview to the Corriere della Sera, upon the club's return to Serie A, Elkann said: "[Serie] B was very hard, it was better to avoid it and nobody liked a season in Purgatory. I'll add that it cost us a lot of money." In the same interview, he also said: "The penalties that Juve have suffered have not been received at all, there had been behaviors judged unacceptable and as such they were punished by the sporting authorities. The difference with Milan can be explained simply by the fact that for the Rossoneri the responsibility for those behaviors fell on external consultants. Now we are back in Serie A with a clear conscience and above all with a strong team, on and off the pitch." In 2010, Elkann supported his cousin Andrea Agnelli's bid to become chairman of Juventus. Under Agnelli, Juventus won an unprecedented, record-breaking nine consecutive Serie A titles (scudetti), six Italian Super Cups, five Italian Cups, and saw the successes of Juventus Women. As with the 2006 FIFA World Cup, Italy national football team's 2021 European Championship win came from a national team with a strong Juventus backbone. With the win of the Argentina football team in the 2022 FIFA World Cup, they extended their record as the team with the most players to have won the FIFA World Cup. Compared to Agnelli, who took an anti-system position, Elkann was said to have taken a softer stance regarding Calciopoli, and to be a reformist; nonetheless, he shared the view on the number of scudetti, saying that since 2003 "Juventus won 11 championships on the field".

Ferrari 
About Scuderia Ferrari, of which Elkann is chairman through Ferrari, and their lack of success in the 2010s, Elkann said that his grandfather, Gianni Agnelli, would be dissappointed. He said: "Today Gianni would be disappointed as all we Ferrari fans are. But I am optimistic because we have two young drivers: they are not 'used to winning' but they have a great desire to 'train to win' with their humility and determination, they are infecting the whole team with this."

Philanthropy 
Elkann supports various philanthropic activities. He is chairman of the Agnelli Foundation, a non-profit organization supporting education through scientific research and initiatives. In April 2019, along with CERN's Director-General Fabiola Gianotti and the Italian architect Renzo Piano, Elkann participated in a media event to unveil Science Gateway, a new scientific education and outreach centre of CERN, which aims to share knowledge and technology with society. The project was funded through external donations, with Stellantis through the FCA Foundation as the main supporter. In June 2021, he celebrated another step with the laying of the first stone. 

In March 2020, to help Italian citizens suffering from the consequences of the COVID-19 pandemic, as the leader of the Agnelli family he deliberated a €10 million donation to the national Civil Protection Department and to La Stampa Foundation – Specchio dei tempi, a social assistance organization that operates in Piedmont, to respond to the local health and social needs in the city of Turin and Piedmont. Starting from July 2020, Elkann supported the launch and expansion of the Arcipelago Educativo project, co-designed and promoted by the Agnelli Foundation, Exor, and Save the Children to fight the risk of dropping out of students due to the lockdown caused by the COVID-19 pandemic. He and his wife Lavinia are also among the supporters of Crescere Insieme al Sant'Anna, a philanthropic project aiming at expanding and improving the neonatal intensive care unit of the main public pedriatic hospital of Turin. On 9 May 2016, the first neonatal intensive care unit was inaugurated.

Personal life 
Elkann was baptized and raised Catholic. Nicknamed Jaki, or Yaki, he has lived in United Kingdom, Brazil, France, and Italy. He married Donna Lavinia Borromeo (born Lavinia Ida Borromeo-Arese on 10 March 1977 in Milan) a member of the prominent Italian aristocratic family the House of Borromeo. She is the daughter of Don Carlo Ferdinando Borromeo, Count of Arona, Piedmont (born in 1935), the son of Vitaliano Borromeo, 2nd Prince of Angera. They married on 4 September 2004 in a Catholic ceremony in the Cappella Bianca on Isola Madre, one of the Borromean Islands of Lake Maggiore. They have three children: Leone, Oceano, and Vita.

Innovation and technology 
Since 2009, Elkann has been attending the annual media and tech conference organized in July every year by Allen & Co at Sun Valley, Idaho. He is also a regular contributor to the Google Camp, which every year gathers tech entrepreneurs, investors, representatives of institutions and pop stars in Sciacca, Agrigento, and other places around Sicily. In August 2011, he took part, along with Sergio Marchionne, to the Rimini Meeting organized by Communion and Liberation. Until 2020, he was a member of the board Bilderberg Group and the only Italian other than journalist Lilli Gruber. In 2012, Elkann attended the annual meeting of the Bilderberg Group in Chantilly, Virginia.

In February 2018, Elkann appeared as one of the protagonists on the podcast series by Reid Hoffman, Masters of Scale. During the interview, which was focused on the theme of the need for companies to adapt over the decades, Elkann described the conditions that allow a company to last over the centuries through the metaphor of the phoenix, and cited in particular the case of Fiat from the 2004 crisis to the creation of the Fiat Chrysler group. In June 2018, he invited Hoffman, Xavier Niel, Peter Thiel, and other global tech leaders to the SEI Torino Forum for the international launch of the new School of Entrepreneurship and Innovation of Turin, an initiative supported by the Agnelli Foundation helping university level students to start new businesses; it opened on 21 March 2018. In February 2021, he was a guest on the Italian Tech Speak podcast, where he described his relationship with technology and innovation.  In October 2021, Elkann participated at the Italian Tech Week in a dialogue focused on innovation, future, and technology with Elon Musk. In the 2022 edition of the event, he conversed onstage with Stripe founder Patrick Collison.

In July 2020, Elkann took part in the institutional presentation of the full-electric Fiat New 500 to Mattarella and Giuseppe Conte, the then Prime Minister of Italy. In December 2021, he was included in Bloomberg's list of the "50 Most Influential people and ideas that defined global business in 2021" for the merger of FCA with the PSA Group to form Stellantis, which started its trading with a $52.7 billion market value.

Yachting and motorsport 

In May 2012, he and his wife took part in the 30th historical reenactment of the Mille Miglia, a regularity race for historic cars dating back to 1927, which takes place on public roads from Brescia to Rome and back, across six regions of Italy. They finished the first leg 217th and 152th overall, out of the 380 cars, aboard the one-off vehicle Fiat 8V, which was realized in limited production at 114 between 1952 and 1954. The couple took part in the 2021 edition of the same event, which was divided in several legs, and went through 1,719,81 kilometers in four driving days across over 200 municipalities of Italy in seven regions. Out of the almost 400 cars, of which 121 belonged to Alfa Romeo, Fiat, and Lancia, they finished 180th aboard an Alfa Romeo 1900 C Super Sprint.

In 2013, Elkann participated in the Transpac Race from Los Angeles to Honolulu where he and Soldini ranked second. In the 2014 edition of Cape2Rio, which goes from Cape Town to Rio de Janeiro, Elkann was a member of the team of Soldini that won and set the new speed record of the regatta. In January 2015, he took part with Soldini in the Maserati team in the Rorc Caribbean 600 Race, a regatta that has been held since February throughout the Caribbean; the team had to retire due to damage to the hydraulic system. Soldini stated that a new San Francisco–Shanghai record attempt with the Maserati was expected in May 2015. They succeeded in doing so at 21 days, 19 hours, 32 minutes, and 54 seconds.

In May 2016, Elkann took part in the 100th edition of the Targa Florio car race in Palermo. In January 2020, he participated in the 16th edition of the Cape2Rio aboard Soldini's VOR70 Maserati, sailing 3.600 miles from Cape Town to Rio de Janeiro. In October 2020, once again aboard with Soldini, he conquered the first position at the 41st edition of the Rolex Middle Sea Race with the Maserati Multi 70. In August 2021, he kicked off the 89th edition of the 24 Hours of Le Mans, which saw the participation of the new Le Mans Hypercar, a class in which Ferrari would enter starting from 2023.

Offices 
Elkan is the chief executive officer of Exor, the chairman of Stellantis, the chairman and general partner of Giovanni Agnelli B.V., and the executive chairman of Ferrari. Additionally, he is the chairman of the Giovanni Agnelli Foundation and chairman of GEDI Gruppo Editoriale. He is also a trustee of MOMA, a member of Pinacoteca Giovanni e Marella Agnelli, and was a member of the Bilderberg Group. Elkann is a board member of The Economist Group, a member of the JP Morgan International Council, and was vice-chairman of Italy's Aspen Institute.

Awards and honours 
 Appeal of Conscience Award, September 2010.
  Nominated Knight of the Order of Merit for Labour in the Italian automotive industry, May 2021.

Ancestry

Notes

References

Bibliography

External links 

 2023 Forbes profile (in English)
 Elkann, John Jacob Philip at Treccani (in Italian)
 John Elkann at Biografie oonline (in Italian)
 Registrazioni di John Elkann at Radio Radicale (in Italian)

1976 births
Agnelli family
American people of Italian descent
Automotive businesspeople
Fiat people
Ferrari people
Italian businesspeople
Italian people of American descent
Italian people of French-Jewish descent
Italian people of Jewish descent
Italian Roman Catholics
Living people
People from New York City
People of Piedmontese descent
Stellantis